Early general elections were  held in Curaçao on 28 April 2017 after the fall of the government led by Hensley Koeiman.

Background
The previous general elections in 2016 resulted in the formation of a four-party coalition government consisting of MAN, the Real Alternative Party (PAR), the National People's Party (PNP) and Sovereign People (PS), headed by Hensley Koeiman of MAN. However, the PS withdrew from the coalition on 11 February 2017, causing it to lose its majority. Prime Minister Koeiman subsequently submitted his resignation to the governor. On 24 March 2017 Gilmar Pisas was sworn in as interim Prime Minister.

Electoral system
The 21 members of the Estates are elected by proportional representation. Parties that won at least one seat in the 2016 election were allowed to participate and a primary election was held to determine which other parties could run. These parties were required to win the equivalent of 1% of the votes cast in the previous general election in order to participate.

Primary election
A total of 14 parties registered to contest the election. Six parties were without parliamentary representation and had to participate in the primary election on 18 and 19 March 2017. Parties that won more than 792 votes (1% of the total votes in the 2016 election) qualified to participate in the election.

Results

References

Elections in Curaçao
2017 in Curaçao
Curaçao
April 2017 events in North America